Solanum prinophyllum, known as the forest nightshade, is a small plant native to the east coast of Australia. It is a short lived herb, annual or perennial.

Forest nightshade grows up to 50 cm high. Its leaves are 5 to 8 cm long and 3 to 5 cm wide. They are spiky and often tinged with purple. The stems are also spiky. Five petalled flowers occur at any time of the year and are blue or lilac in colour. Petals are fused at the base.  The fruit is around 15 to 20 mm in diameter and the stem is 10 to 20 mm long. The fruit is a berry, which stays green or turns purple.

The habitat is moist areas, in sclerophyll forest, or disturbed areas in rainforest.

References

prinophyllum
Solanales of Australia
Flora of New South Wales
Flora of Queensland
Flora of Victoria (Australia)